Aberford and Lotherton cum Aberford are adjacent civil parishes in the metropolitan borough of the City of Leeds, West Yorkshire, England.  The parishes contain 25 listed buildings that are recorded in the National Heritage List for England.  Of these, one is listed at Grade II*, the middle of the three grades, and the others are at Grade II, the lowest grade.  The parishes contain the village of Aberford and the surrounding countryside, including the area around Lotherton Hall.  Most of the listed buildings are houses and cottages, and the others include churches, a market cross, a former water mill and a former windmill, a bridge, farm buildings, a hotel and a former stable block, a war memorial, and three milestones.



Key

Buildings

References

Citations

Sources

Lists of listed buildings in West Yorkshire